Catoptria luctiferella is a species of moth of the family Crambidae. It is found in Europe.

References

Crambini
Moths of Europe
Moths described in 1813